Gordon Johncock (born August 5, 1936) is an American former racing driver. He won the Indianapolis 500 twice, and was the 1976 USAC Marlboro Championship Trail champion.

Early career
Johncock began racing at Berlin Raceway in Marne, Michigan. Johncock began his USAC and CART/IndyCar career in 1964 when he drove for Weinberger Racing. He ran four races in 1964, and then went full-time in 1965. Johncock's first USAC victory was scored at the Milwaukee Mile in August 1965. In 1966, he went winless in nine starts out of 16 races, so he left Gerhardt Racing at the end of the year, to form his own team, Johncock Racing. His primary sponsor became Gilmore Broadcasting and Johncock was the only other "owner-driver" in IndyCar other than A. J. Foyt. Although Johncock's team won six races in a three-year period (1967-1969), things went downhill when Johncock lost the Gilmore sponsorship at the end of 1970. Between 1970 and 1973, Johncock went winless, his team shuttered operations, and Johncock found himself in bankruptcy court. He also was involved in a divorce with his ex-wife.

Johncock's winless drought came to an end when he joined the STP/Patrick Racing team ahead of the 1973 USAC season. At the 1973 Indianapolis 500, a major accident at the start involving Salt Walther, coupled with two days of rain, postponed the race until late Wednesday afternoon. When the race was held, Johncock's teammate Swede Savage was severely injured in a fiery crash on lap 58. A moment later, Armando Teran, a pit crew member on the same STP/Patrick team, was struck by a fire truck going northbound in the pits, and was fatally injured at the scene. When the race resumed, Johncock took the lead on lap 73 and held it until rain fell again on the 133rd lap. Nearing 6 p.m., the race was red flagged and declared over. After a short and muted victory lane celebration, Johncock went to visit Savage at the hospital. Afterward, the celebratory victory banquet was cancelled. Instead, Johncock and his crew went to a local fast-food restaurant for hamburgers. 33 days after the race, Savage died from his injuries.

Johncock won the USAC national championship in 1976, snatching the title from Johnny Rutherford in the final race of the season at Phoenix International Raceway. In 1976 and 1978 he finished third at Indianapolis, and in 1977 he was leading A. J. Foyt when the car's crankshaft broke with sixteen laps to go.

Johncock took a second Indianapolis 500 victory in 1982 by a car length over Rick Mears. After falling behind on the final sequence of pit stops, Mears was rapidly closing on Johncock in the final laps, and on the 197th and 198th laps came from 3 seconds back to within car lengths. Johncock's tires were deteriorating by the lap, and with each turn the car understeered more severely. Mears caught Johncock at the start of the final lap and tried to pass him for the win, but Johncock made a decisive defense of first place in Turn One and held on to win by 0.16 seconds. At the time it was the closest finish in history and remains the fourth-closest behind the 1992, 2014, and 2006 races. Mears would later joke about watching the race over and over "to see if this time I get around Gordy". Johncock, during a live interview on ABC years later, offered that if the dramatic duel had occurred two or three years later—when Mears had additional experience—the Californian would probably have pulled off the winning pass.

Johncock took another three Indycar races, including the 1982 Michigan 500 to complete two legs of what was then known as the Triple Crown (Indianapolis, Michigan, and Pocono) before retiring from full-time racing in 1985. He returned for occasional appearances in 1987, 1988, 1989, 1991 and retired for good after the 1992 Indianapolis 500.

Johncock's last Indycar win was in the opening round of the 1983 CART PPG Indy Car World Series at the Atlanta Motor Speedway driving a Cosworth powered Patrick Wildcat. Johncock, who started 3rd on the grid, won the 200 mile, 132 lap race at an average of 146.133 mph from the Penske-Cosworth of Al Unser and John Paul Jr. in a 1982 model Penske-Cosworth.

Johncock competed in 21 NASCAR Sprint Cup Series events in his career. He earned three top-fives and four top-tens in his limited schedules. The best of those finishes were a pair of fourths in 1973 at Daytona and 1966 at Rockingham.

First retirement
Johncock abruptly retired from IndyCar racing during the first week of practice for the 1985 Indianapolis 500, just before qualifications. He served on the IMS Radio Network in 1985 but decided to return to racing in 1986. He planned to enter the 1986 Indianapolis 500, but his funding for a car fell through. He wound up sitting out the race. He attempted another return in 1987. During the first week of time trials, Jim Crawford suffered serious injuries to his feet. Johncock was hired to drive in replacement and qualified for the race.

Second retirement
Johncock completed a sixth-place finish in the 1991 Indy 500, despite having flu-like symptoms the morning of the race. His final race was the 1992 Indy 500, where he dropped out with engine failure. Since his retirement, Johncock has distanced himself from motorsports, and focuses on his timber business in Michigan. He participated in a 2004 interview on ESPN Classic's "Big Ticket" review of the 1982 Indy 500. In the interview, he admitted that his interests in racing were now limited, and was no longer his daily focus. In discussing the 1973 race, Johncock appeared to have made peace with the circumstances. While most discredit the race as being rain-shortened, and for its overall miserable memories, Johncock insisted that his car was undoubtedly the fastest on the track, led easily, and was not simply in front at the time of the red flag by chance.

Johncock chose not to attend the 2011 Indianapolis 500, which celebrated the 100th anniversary of the first race. Despite the fact that all living former participants, and particularly living former winners, were invited, Johncock did not attend any of the festivities, seemingly by choice. A year later, Speedway officials again invited him to attend, and he did return to the Speedway and participated in pre-race festivities at the 2012 race.

Awards
Johncock was inducted into the Indianapolis Motor Speedway Hall of Fame in 1997.
In 1999 he was inducted into the International Motorsports Hall of Fame.
He was inducted in the Motorsports Hall of Fame of America in 2002.

Motorsports career results

American open-wheel racing
(key) (Races in bold indicate pole position)

USAC Championship Car

PPG Indy Car World Series

 ''1 Johncock was listed as the primary entry and participated in practice; prior to qualifying, Johncock announced he was withdrawing, and announced a retirement from driving.

Indianapolis 500

NASCAR
(key) (Bold – Pole position awarded by qualifying time. Italics – Pole position earned by points standings or practice time. * – Most laps led.)

Grand National Series

Winston Cup Series

Daytona 500

International Race of Champions
(key) (Bold – Pole position. * – Most laps led.)

References

NASCAR Stats at Racing-Reference.info
Greatest 33 Profile Article

External links
 
 The Greatest 33

Living people
1937 births
People from Hastings, Michigan
Racing drivers from Michigan
Indianapolis 500 drivers
Indianapolis 500 winners
Champ Car champions
Champ Car drivers
NASCAR drivers
International Race of Champions drivers
International Motorsports Hall of Fame inductees
USAC Stock Car drivers
Team Penske drivers
McLaren Racing drivers